Insaciable (also known as The Insatiable Widow) is a 1976 Argentine erotic drama film written and directed by Armando Bó. It stars Isabel Sarli as a "worried nymphomaniac in search of satisfaction or cure". The film was highly controversial in Argentina due to its nudity and sexual content and lesbianism. This was played upon with a film poster documenting extracts from the Argentine press condemning the film and documenting those calling for it to be banned or censored.

Cast
Isabel Sarli 			
Jorge Barreiro 	
Santiago Gómez Cou 			
Armando Bó 		
Horacio Bruno 		
Mario Casado 			
Claude Marting 		
Enrique Vargas 	 		
Olga Walk			
Lechuguita 		
Amelia Sanguinetti

References

External links
 

1976 films
1970s Spanish-language films
Films directed by Armando Bó
Films about sexuality
Argentine erotic drama films
Lesbianism
1976 LGBT-related films
1970s erotic drama films
1976 drama films
1970s Argentine films